The Upper Jhelum Canal is an irrigation canal in Pakistan that provides water to 1.8 million acres of farmland.

The Upper Jhelum Canal starts at the Jhelum River at Mangla Dam. It runs through Gujrat and Mandi Bahauddin in Punjab, Pakistan, and then finally ends up in the Chenab River at Khanki Barrage. Floodwater nullahs drain through the Upper Jhelum Canal into the Jhelum River at several locations.

The canal was designed and built by Sir John Benton, a British irrigation engineer, who later became inspector general of irrigation. Work on the canal started in 1913 and was completed in 1916 when the canal became fully operational. 

In the 1960s, the construction of Mangla Dam forced the replacement of the canal's head regulator . On October 24, 2019, the canal was severely damaged by the 2019 Kashmir earthquake. The Punjab Irrigation Department closed the canal and rehabilitated it in a couple of weeks..

References

External links 
15 dead as van plunges into Upper Jhelum Canal

Buildings and structures in Punjab, Pakistan
Irrigation canals
Canals in Pakistan